Mahaprasthanika Parva, or the "Book of the Great Journey", is the seventeenth of eighteen books of the Indian epic Mahabharata. It traditionally has three chapters, as does the critical edition. It is the shortest book in the Epic.

Mahaprasthanika Parva recites the journey of the Pandavas across India and finally their ascent towards Himalayas, as they climb their way to heaven on Mount Sumeru. As they leave their kingdom, a dog befriends them and joins their long journey. On their way, Draupadi dies first. Four of the Pandava brothers also die midway. Only Yudhishthira and the dog reaches Mount Sumeru. Their conversations, and reasons for not reaching heaven are described in Mahaprasthanika Parva.

Structure and chapters
Mahaprasthanika Parva (book) has 3 adhyayas (sections, chapters) and has no secondary sub-parvas (parts or little books). It is the smallest book of the epic.

Background

At the end of Mausala Parva, Vyasa advises Arjuna and his brothers to retire and renounce their kingdom as the purpose of their life has been served. Arjuna informs Yudhishthira of Vyasa's advise. Draupadi and his brothers agree.

Summary
King Yudhishthira crowns Parikshit as the king of Hastinapur, in care of Yuyutsu. In Indraprastha, the Yadava prince Vajra is crowned as the king. Then they start their journey of India and the Himalayas.

As the Pandavas leave, a dog befriends them and they take him along for the journey. The Pandavas first 'set out with their faces towards the east', reaching the lauhityaṃ salilārṇavam (literally the red waters, possibly the river Brahmaputra, one of whose names is 'Lohit'). There, the god Agni appeared before them, commanding Arjuna to return the bow Gandiva, that he had borrowed from the god Varuna for the burning of the Khandava forest.  Agni says that this bow was asked by him from Varuna for the use of Partha. Urged by his brothers, Arjuna threw both the bow and the inexhaustible quivers into the waters. They turn south, reaching the sea, then proceed up the west coast of India until they reach Dwaraka.  They see it submerged under the sea, as described by Arjuna in the Mausala Parva. The sight of a beautiful city submerged and dead, makes them depressed. They turn north, stop at Rishikesh, then cross the Himalayas.

As they cross the Himalayas, Yajnaseni is the first person to die.  Bhima asks Yudhishthira why Draupadi died early and couldn't continue the journey to heaven.  Yudhishthira claims that though they all were equal unto her she had great partiality for Dhananjaya(Arjuna), so she obtained the fruit of that conduct today. The remaining Pandavas continue their journey. Next, Sahadeva dies on the way. Yudhishthira explains Sahadeva like his other brothers was virtuous in every respect, except he suffered from the vice of pride and vanity, thought none was equal to him in wisdom. The brothers continue on their way to Mount Meru. Nakula dies next. Yudhishthira explains that Nakula also suffered from the vice of pride and vanity, thinking he was the most handsome person in the world. Arjuna is the next person to die without completing the journey. Yudhishthira explains to Bhima, Arjuna too suffered from the vice of pride and vanity, thinking he was the most skilled, most powerful hero in the world, disregarding others. Yudhishthira, Bhima and the dog continue forward.

Bhima tires and falls down. He asks his elder brother why he, Bhima, is unable to complete the journey to heaven. Yudhishthira explains his brother's vice of gluttony, who used to eat too much without thinking about the hunger of others and he also used to boast of his strength. It is for that he has fallen down.

Yudhishthira and the dog continue their journey. In Chapter 3 of Mahaprasthanika Parva, as the dog and Yudhishthira continue their walk up Mount Meru, Indra appears in his chariot with a loud sound, suggesting he doesn't need to walk all the way, he can jump in and together they can go to heaven. Yudhishthira refuses, says he could not go to heaven with Indra without his brothers and Draupadi. Indra tells Yudhishthira, all of them after their death, entered heaven. Yudhishthira asks if his friend, the dog, to jump into the car first. Indra replies that the dog cannot enter his chariot, only Yudhishthira can. Yudhishthira refuses to leave the dog. He claims the dog is his friend, and for him to betray his friend during his life's journey would be a great sin. Indra says that after abandoning his brothers and wife, he had acquired great merit, then why be stupefied by a dog, he is renouncing everything. Yudhishthira said that there is neither friendship nor enmity with those that are dead. When his brothers and Draupadi died, he was unable to revive them, hence he abandoned them. However, he cannot abandon the one who is alive beside him. Indra urges him to consider his own happiness, abandon the dog and hop into his chariot. Yudhishthira refuses to go into the chariot, explaining he cannot abandon the dog who is his companion, for his own happiness, while he is alive. The dog, watching Yudhishthira's commitment for his friend, transforms and reappears as deity Dharma. The deity Dharma then praises Yudhishthira for his virtues. Dharma tells him that formerly, during their exile in the woods, where his brothers of great pride met with death, disregarding his love for his brothers, he asked him to revive Nakula, and passed his trial. Again on this occasion, thinking the dog to be devoted to him, he had renounced the very chariot of the celestials instead of renouncing him. Hence, there is no one in heaven equal to him, and had earned regions of great felicity. Then they all proceed to heaven. On their way they meet Narada who tells them that Yudhishthira had transcended the achievements of even the royal sages. He had heard none else other than him to achieve this, attaining to heaven with a human body. The righteous-souled king, saluting the deities, proceeded forward. Yudhishthira enters heaven on Indra's chariot.

English translations
Mahaprasthanika Parva was composed in Sanskrit. Several translations in English are available. Two translations from 19th century, now in public domain, are those by Kisari Mohan Ganguli and Manmatha Nath Dutt. The translations vary with each translator's interpretations.

Debroy, in 2011, notes that updated critical edition of Mahaprasthanika Parva, after removing verses generally accepted so far as spurious and inserted into the original, has 3 adhyayas (chapters) and 106 shlokas (verses).

Quotes and teachings

Mahaprasthanika Parva, Chapter 3:

See also
Previous book of Mahabharata: Mausala Parva
Next book of Mahabharata: Svargarohana Parva

References

External links
 Mahaprasthanika Parva, English Translation by Kisari Mohan Ganguli
 Mahaprasthanika Parva, English Translation by Manmatha Nath Dutt
 Mahaprasthanika Parva in Sanskrit by Vyasadeva with commentary by Nilakantha - Worldcat OCLC link
 Mahaprasthanika Parva in Sanskrit and Hindi by Ramnarayandutt Shastri, Volume 5
PDF and eBook of Ganguli’s translation, with Sanskrit PDF.
 "Yudhishthira and His Dog", A4 PDF, tablet version (Ganguli’s version annotated) and Sanskrit text links.

Parvas in Mahabharata